Muthupatti is a  Village in Madurai district of Tamil Nadu, India.

Villages in Madurai district